C. Kenneth Powell (August 11, 1939 – October 13, 2019) was the chairman of the South Carolina Republican Party from 1971 to 1974.

C. Kenneth Powell was active in the SCGOP, where he first worked on Floyd Spence's 1962 campaign for Congress as a Republican. He ran several times for elective office and became chair of the Richland County Republican Party in 1970. Powell served the S.C. Republican Party as its chair from 1971 to 1974. The election of 1974 was a landmark year for the Party with the victory of James B. Edwards, the first Republican governor of the state since Reconstruction.

References

1939 births
Living people
South Carolina Republicans
State political party chairs of South Carolina